John Barker was an English merchant and politician who sat in the House of Commons  in 1659.

Barker was a city of London merchant and a member of the Worshipful Company of Grocers. On 13 September 1651 he was elected alderman for the City of London for Bread Street ward.

In 1659, Barker was elected Member of Parliament for Ilchester in the Third Protectorate Parliament. 
 
Barker married a daughter of Thomas Westrow who was alderman and sheriff of London in 1625.

References

Year of birth missing
Year of death missing
English MPs 1659
English merchants
Councilmen and Aldermen of the City of London
17th-century merchants
17th-century English businesspeople